Going! Going! Gone! is a 1919 American short comedy film featuring Harold Lloyd. Although this film is presumed lost, versions with French intertitles have been posted on YouTube.

Plot
A group of young ladies are wading in a creek.  A crab latches onto the foot of one of them.  The other girls, including Miss Goulash, see Harold and Snub who helpfully free the girl from the crab's clutches.  Harold and Snub ride off on their tandem bicycle.  Two crooks steal a sack of cash from a railroad station and take a car as an escape vehicle.  When the car stalls, the crooks enlist Harold and Snub to help them push it down the road.  While Harold and Snub are pushing, the crooks steal their bicycle.  Meanwhile the local sheriff has been informed about the theft and is told the crooks escaped in a car—the vehicle that Harold and Snub now occupy.  A large posse pursues the car and eventually captures Harold and Snub.  They are taken to the sheriff's office.  While the posse is distracted, Harold and Snub sneak out the front door.  At about the same time, the crooks ride the bike into town and stop outside the sheriff's office where they see Miss Goulash.  She rejects their amorous advances.  Harold and Snub recognize the crooks and begin to fight with them.  The posse emerges and tries to re-arrest Harold and Snub.  Miss Goulash recognizes Harold and Snub from earlier in the day at the creek and helps verify their innocence.  The posse takes the crooks away.

Cast
 Harold Lloyd
 Snub Pollard as Snub
 Bebe Daniels as Miss Goulash
 William Blaisdell
 Sammy Brooks
 Harry Burns
 Billy Fay (as B. Fay)
 William Gillespie
 Wallace Howe (as W. Howe)
 Dee Lampton
 Gus Leonard
 Belle Mitchell
 Marie Mosquini
 James Parrott
 Bud Jamison as Professor Goulash (uncredited)

See also
 Harold Lloyd filmography

References

External links

Copy preserved from a European print (Youtube.com)

1919 films
1919 comedy films
1919 short films
American silent short films
American black-and-white films
Silent American comedy films
Films directed by Gilbert Pratt
American comedy short films
1910s American films
1910s English-language films